Pongpanot Naknayom (Thai พงศ์ปณต นาคนายม), (born Sujin Naknayom (Thai:สุจินต์ นาคนายม), January 5, 1979) is a Thai retired footballer.

Honours

Clubs

Chonburi
 Thailand Premier League 2007 : Winner
 Kor Royal Cup 2008 : Winner
 Kor Royal Cup 2009 : Winner

Rayong F.C.
Regional League Central-East Division 2015 : Winner

External links
Sujin Naknayom profile at the Chonburi website
Profile at Thaipremierleague.co.th

1979 births
Living people
Pongpanot Naknayom
Pongpanot Naknayom
Pongpanot Naknayom
Association football goalkeepers
Pongpanot Naknayom